Remember the Milk (RTM) is an application service provider for Web-based task- and time-management. It allows users to manage tasks from a computer or smartphone, both online and offline. Created in 2004 by a two-person Australian company, it now has international contributors.

Features 
Remember the Milk allows users to create multiple task lists. Added tasks can be edited (or not) to include various fields, locations can be added, and an integrated Google Maps feature allows users to save commonly used locations. Tasks can also be organized by tags. Tasks can be postponed, and Remember the Milk will inform users of the number of times a given task has been postponed. Remember the Milk offers integration with Gmail, Microsoft Outlook, and SMS.

See also 
 Getting Things Done
 Digital calendar

References

External links
 

Calendaring software
Web applications
Administrative software
Task management software
Software companies based in the San Francisco Bay Area
Software companies of the United States